Dustin Renton Melton (born 11 April 1995) is a Zimbabwean cricketer who plays for Derbyshire. He made his first-class debut on 29 August 2019, for Derbyshire against Australia, during Australia's tour of England. He made his Twenty20 debut on 11 September 2020, for Derbyshire in the 2020 t20 Blast.

References

External links
 

1995 births
Living people
South African cricketers
Derbyshire cricketers
Sportspeople from Harare
University of Pretoria alumni